Schindler Creek is a  long second-order tributary to the Niobrara River in Knox County, Nebraska.

Course
Schindler Creek rises on the North Branch Verdigre Creek divide about 5 miles northwest of Verdigre, Nebraska and then flows generally northeast to join the Niobrara River about 2 miles southwest of Ponca, Nebraska.

Watershed
Schindler Creek drains  of area, receives about 24.7 in/year of precipitation, has a wetness index of 444.27, and is about 10.44% forested.

See also

List of rivers of Nebraska

References

Rivers of Knox County, Nebraska
Rivers of Nebraska